Maryland is a suburb of Newcastle, New South Wales, Australia, located  from Newcastle's central business district. It is part of the City of Newcastle local government area.

Maryland has two public and one private school, a Baptist church, a skate-park and a shopping complex. Originally an agricultural area since the 1970s started to become more developed which has an outlook of the wetlands.

Education 

 Located at 51 T Bell Maryland Primary is a government co ed primary school
 Located at 295 Maryland Drive Glendore Public is a government co ed primary school

Heritage listings
Maryland has a number of heritage-listed sites, including:
 79 Callan Avenue: Thomas Family Grave

References

Suburbs of Newcastle, New South Wales